Prispevki za novejšo zgodovino (Contributions to Contemporary History / Contributions a l'histoire contemporaine / Beiträge zur Zeitgeschichte) is a peer-reviewed academic journal covering the contemporary history. It is published by the Institute of Contemporary History, Slovenia, based in Ljubljana and the editor-in-chief is Jure Gašparič. The journal was established in 1960 as Prispevki za zgodovino delavskega gibanja (Contributions to History of Workers' Movement) and in 1980, it was renamed to Prispevki za novejšo zgodovino.

Abstracting and indexing
The journal is abstracted and indexed in:
ERIH PLUS
Scopus

See also 
List of academic journals published in Slovenia
Zgodovinski časopis

References

External links

History journals
Publications established in 1960
Academic journals of Slovenia
Slovene-language journals
Academic journals published in Slovenia